The mixed relay triathlon was part of the Triathlon at the 2014 Commonwealth Games program. The competition was held on 26 July 2014 at Strathclyde Country Park in Glasgow. This was the first time the event has been held at the Commonwealth Games.

Competition format
Each team consisted of four athletes (two male and two female) and each had to cover a course of  swimming,  road bicycling, and  road running.

Results

References

Triathlon at the 2014 Commonwealth Games
Triathlon 2014